Robert of Chester (Latin: Robertus Castrensis) was an English Arabist of the 12th century. He translated several historically important books from Arabic to Latin, such as:

 Book of the Composition of Alchemy: translated in 1144, this was the first book on alchemy to become available in Europe
Compendious Book on Calculation by Completion and Balancing: al-Khwārizmī's book about algebra, translated in 1145

In the 1140s Robert worked in Spain, where the division of the country between Muslim and Christian rulers resulted in opportunities for interchange between the different cultures.  However, by the end of the decade he had returned to England.  Some sources identify him with Robert of Ketton who was also active as an Arabic-Latin translator in the 1140s.
However, Ketton and Chester, while both places in England, are a long way apart.  Also, when in Spain, Robert of Ketton was based in the Kingdom of Navarre, whereas Robert of Chester is known to have worked in Segovia.

See also
Latin translations of the 12th century
Louis Charles Karpinski

Notes

References
 
 Charles Burnett, ‘Ketton, Robert of (fl. 1141–1157)’, Oxford Dictionary of National Biography, Oxford University Press, 2004. (This is, in effect, a double biography covering both Robert of Ketton and Robert of Chester.)

External links
, complete text online. Translation of Robert of Chester, or Robert of Ketton.


Arabic–Latin translators
Translators from Arabic
12th-century English people
Translators of the Quran into Latin
Medieval Arabists
Medieval orientalists
Medieval linguists
Medieval English scientists
12th-century translators
12th-century English mathematicians
12th-century Latin writers